Esfeshad (also Romanized as Esfeshād and Esfashād; also known as Asb Shahr and Asp Shahr) is a village in Qaen Rural District, in the Central District of Qaen County, South Khorasan Province, Iran. At the 2006 census, its population was 2,400, in 582 families.

References 

Populated places in Qaen County